D8, D.VIII, D VIII, D08 or D-8 may refer to:

Entertainment
 d8 (magazine), a 1990s American magazine on role playing culture
 D8 (TV channel), a French TV channel
 Dissipated Eight, a collegiate all-male a cappella group from Middlebury College
 d8, the eight-sided die used often in table-top role-playing games

Transportation
 Bavarian D VIII, an 1888 German steam locomotive
 Caterpillar D8, a track-type tractor
 D-8 Armored Car, a Soviet vehicle
 D8 (Aircraft), an American airliner
 Dewoitine D.8, a French aircraft
 Dunne D.8, a British Dunne aircraft
 Fokker D.VIII, a 1918 German parasol-monoplane fighter aircraft
 HMAS Vendetta (D08), a 1954 Royal Australian Navy Daring class destroyer
 Pacific D-8, a glider
 Pfalz D.VIII, a German 1918 fighter aircraft
 Pro FE Straton D-8, a Czech motorglider
 ProFe D-8 Moby Dick, a Czech motorglider
 Spyker D8, a 2009 concept car
 GE Dash 8 Series, a locomotive series

Other
 D8 motorway (Czech Republic), a road in the northern Czech Republic
 D8 road (Croatia), a section of the Adriatic highway
 Data8, a magnetic tape data storage format pioneered by Exabyte Corporation
 Digital8, a consumer digital videotape format developed by Sony
 Developing 8 Countries, a group of eight large, mostly Muslim nations
 District 8 (disambiguation)
 Dublin 8, a Dublin, Ireland postal district
 IATA code for Norwegian Air International
 ATC code D08, Antiseptics and Disinfectants, a subgroup of the Anatomical Therapeutic Chemical Classification System
 d8 may refer to the d electron count of a transition metal complex
 D8 refers to the dihedral group of eight elements
 Delta-8-THC, a psychoactive cannabinoid
 Williams County School District 8

See also
8D (disambiguation)